Pala  may refer to:

Places

Chad
Pala, Chad, the capital of the region of Mayo-Kebbi Ouest

Estonia
Pala, Kose Parish, village in Kose Parish, Harju County
Pala, Kuusalu Parish, village in Kuusalu Parish, Harju County
Pala, Järva County, village in Türi Parish, Järva County
Pala, Jõgeva County, village in Peipsiääre Parish, Jõgeva County
Pala Parish, former rural municipality in Jõgeva County

India
Pala, Kerala, a town in the state of Kerala
Pala (State Assembly constituency)
Pala dynasty (disambiguation), several historical ruling groups
Pala Empire, an imperial power originating in Bengal during the Late Classical period
Pala Lake, English name for Palak Dil, a large lake in the state of Mizoram, Northeast India

Turkey
Palā or Pala: a Bronze Age country in northern Anatolia, 
 where the extinct Palaic language (or Palaumnili), a part of the Indo-European language family, was spoken.

United States
Pala, California, a small community in the Pala Indian Reservation within San Diego County
Pala Casino Resort and Spa, a casino located in Pala, California

Fiction
 Pala, a fictional island in Aldous Huxley's Island (Huxley novel)
 Pala, a fictional town in Far Cry 2, a video game

Other 
 Pala (album), the second album from Friendly Fires, released in 2011.
 Pala (surname), a list of people with the surname Pala
 Pala (sword), a short kind of Turkish sword or kilij
 Pala Empire, an empire and dynasty on the Indian subcontinent, founded in 750
 Pala Hamburger, a Chinese fast-food chain
 Pala (folk art), a folk-theatre form, native to the Indian state Odisha, akin to jatra (Bengal)
 PaLA or Pennsylvania Library Association
 PALA or Partido Laborista Agrario, the Labor and Agrarian Party of Panama 
 PALA, the Poetics and Linguistics Association, an international academic association that supports studies of linguistic and literary styles
 PALA, Presidential Active Lifestyle Award, one of the awards given as part of the President's Challenge in the United States

See also
 Palai (disambiguation)
 Palas (disambiguation)